Stringmansassy were an Australian jazz folk duo formed in Brisbane, Queensland in 1996 by guitarist Aaron Hopper and vocalist Kacey Patrick. They performed a combination of jazz and folk, the group released three studio albums, Persuasion (2000), Beautiful Day (2003) and Dragonfly (2004). They disbanded in 2008.

Originally called Sassy and the Stringman they toured nationally and in Germany. Their music was played on radio networks including "Beautiful Day" which on high rotation by Australian Broadcasting Corporation radio.

Discography

Albums

 Persuasion (2000)
 Beautiful Day (2003) - MRA Entertainment Group
 Dragonfly (2004) - MRA Entertainment Group
 The Live Experience: 2000/2008 (Double CD, 2008)

References

External links

  archived from the original on 28 August 2008. Accessed on 22 December 2017.

Australian folk music groups
Musical groups from Brisbane
Musical groups established in 1996
Musical groups disestablished in 2008